John Thomas Pender (1 November 1885 – 22 January 1937) was an Australian rules footballer who played with Geelong in the Victorian Football League (VFL).

Notes

External links 

1885 births
1937 deaths
Australian rules footballers from Victoria (Australia)
Geelong Football Club players